Autorickshawkarante Bharya is a 2022 Indian Malayalam-language drama film directed by Harikumar. Written by M. Mukundan in his screenplay debut based on the short story by the same name, the film stars Ann Augustine (in her first lead appearance since 2015) and Suraj Venjaramoodu in the titular roles. Produced by KV Abdul Nasser under the banner of Benzy Productions, Autorickshawkarante Bharya features Kailash, Swasika, Janardhanan, Devi Ajith, and Neena Kurup in major supporting roles. Shot by Alagappan N., the soundtrack of the film was composed by Ouseppachan. The film released on 28 October 2022.

Plot
Sajeevan is a lazy Auto Rickshaw driver who marries the "determined" Radhika. Circumstances force Radhika to take up driving the Auto Rickshaw for a living.

Cast 
 Ann Augustine as Radhika 
 Suraj Venjaramoodu as Sajeevan 
 Kailash
 Swasika
 Janardhanan
 Devi Ajith
 Neena Kurup

Production
Filming began in December 2021 in Mahé, India, and was wrapped up by February 2022.

References

External links
 

2022 films
2020s Malayalam-language films
Indian drama films
Films shot in Kannur
Films shot in Thalassery
Films shot in Kozhikode